Violeta Spirovska (born 11 January 1981) is a Macedonian footballer who plays as a midfielder for the North Macedonia national team.

International career
Spirovska made her debut for the North Macedonia national team on 19 September 2009, coming on as a substitute for Shireta Brahimi against Slovakia.

References

1981 births
Living people
Women's association football midfielders
Macedonian women's footballers
North Macedonia women's international footballers